John "Jean" McFarlane (24 November 1899 – 25 February 1956) was a Scottish footballer who played for Celtic, Middlesbrough and Dunfermline Athletic as a half back.

He made over 300 appearances for Celtic in a decade as a first team player at the club, winning five major honours: two Scottish Football League championships (1921–22 and 1925–26) and three Scottish Cups (1923, 1925 and 1927).

McFarlane was selected four times for the Scottish Football League XI and played in an international trial match in 1924 but never gained a full cap for Scotland, one of few players to appear so often for the SFL team without playing at least once for the SFA.

His nephew Willie Fagan was also a footballer who played for Celtic and won the English Football League title with Liverpool.

References

1899 births
1956 deaths
Scottish footballers
People from Bathgate
Footballers from West Lothian
Association football wing halves
Celtic F.C. players
Middlesbrough F.C. players
Dunfermline Athletic F.C. players
Scottish Football League players
English Football League players
Scottish Football League representative players
Scottish Junior Football Association players
Expatriate association footballers in the Republic of Ireland
Shelbourne F.C. players
Scottish expatriate footballers
Scottish expatriate sportspeople in Ireland
Wellesley Juniors F.C. players